The Round Barn, Dubuque Township is a historic building located in Dubuque Township in Dubuque County, Iowa, United States. It was built in 1915 as a dairy barn. The building is a true round barn that measures  in diameter. The structure is constructed in clay tile from the Johnston Brothers' Clay Works and it features a windowed cupola and dormers on the north and west sides.

References

Infrastructure completed in 1915
Buildings and structures in Dubuque County, Iowa
National Register of Historic Places in Dubuque County, Iowa
Barns on the National Register of Historic Places in Iowa
Round barns in Iowa
1915 establishments in Iowa